Bai Tao (born 1963) is a Chinese business executive and senior economist who is the current chairman and party secretary of China Life Insurance Company, in office since 14 January 2022.

Biography 
Born in 1963, Bai graduated from the Renmin University of China. Beginning in 1984, he served in several posts in the Industrial and Commercial Bank of China, including vice president of Jilin Branch, president of Hunan Branch, and general manager of Risk Management Department. In June 2014, he was appointed vice chairman of China Life Insurance Company, but having held the position for only two years. In October 2016, he became deputy general manager of China Investment Corporation, concurrently serving as general manager of Central Huijin Investment. In June 2018, he was recalled to China Life Insurance Company, where he was vice chairman and deputy party secretary. In January 2020, he rose to become chairman and party branch secretary of the State Development & Investment Corporation, and served until 14 January 2022, when he was appointed chairman and party secretary of China Life Insurance Company. His predecessor Wang Bin was sacked for corruption on January 8.

References 

1963 births
Living people
Renmin University of China alumni
People's Republic of China economists